Sulfadimidine or sulfamethazine is a sulfonamide antibacterial.

There are non-standardized abbreviations for it as "sulfadimidine" (abbreviated SDI and more commonly but less reliably SDD) and as "sulfamethazine" (abbreviated SMT and more commonly but less reliably SMZ). Other names include sulfadimerazine, sulfadimezine, and sulphadimethylpyrimidine.

References

Further reading 
 ChemDB. "Sulfamethazine", ChemDB, National Institute of Allergy and Infectious Diseases (NIAID), National Institutes of Health (NIH)
 
 PubChem. "Sulfamethazine - Substance Summary", PubChem, National Center for Biotechnology Information (NCBI), National Library of Medicine (NLM), National Institutes of Health (NIH)

Sulfonamide antibiotics
Pyrimidines